Count of Elda is a hereditary title in the Peerage of Spain accompanied by the dignity of Grandee, granted in 1577 by Philip II to Juan Coloma, who was Viceroy of Sardinia.

The name makes reference to the town of Elda in Alicante.

Counts of Elda (1577)

 Juan Coloma y Cardona, 1st Count of Elda (1522-1586)
 Antonio Coloma y de Saá, 2nd Count of Elda (1555-1619), son of the 1st Count
 Juan Coloma y Mendoza, 3rd Count of Elda (1591-1638), son of the 2nd Count
 Juan Andrés Coloma, 4th Count of Elda (1621-1694), son of the 3rd Count
 Francisco Coloma y Pujadas, 5th Count of Elda (1656-1712), son of the 4th Count
 Francisco Coloma y de la Cerda, 6th Count of Elda (1698-1729), son of the 5th Count
 Gonzalo Arias Dávila y Coloma, 7th Count of Elda (1666-1738), grandson of the 4th Count
 Diego Arias Dávila, 8th Count of Elda (d. 1751), son of the 7th Count
 Francisco Arias Dávila, 9th Count of Elda (d. 1783), son of the 8th Count
 Laura Castellví de Alagón y Coloma, 10th Countess of Elda (d. 1799), great-granddaughter of the 6th Count
 Felipe Carlos Osorio y Castellví, 11th Count of Elda (1758-1815), son of the 10th Countess
 Felipe Osorio y de la Cueva, 12th Count of Elda (1795-1859), son of the 11th Count
 María del Pilar Osorio y Gutiérrez de los Ríos, 13th Countess of Elda (1829-1921), daughter of the 12th Count
 José Falcó y Álvarez de Toledo, 14th Count of Elda (1898-1983), grandson of the 13th Countess
 Enrique Falcó y Carrión, 15th Count of Elda (b. 1933), son of the 14th Count

See also
List of current Grandees of Spain

References

Bibliography
 

Grandees of Spain
Counts of Spain
Lists of Spanish nobility